This is a list of NUTS2 statistical regions of the Czech Republic by Human Development Index as of 2023 with data for the year 2021.

References 

Human Development Index
Czech

Czechia